The canton of Fontaine-lès-Dijon is an administrative division of the Côte-d'Or department, eastern France. Its borders were modified at the French canton reorganisation which came into effect in March 2015. Its seat is in Fontaine-lès-Dijon.

It consists of the following communes:
 
Ahuy
Asnières-lès-Dijon
Bellefond
Bligny-le-Sec
Bretigny
Brognon
Champagny
Clénay
Curtil-Saint-Seine
Daix
Darois
Étaules
Flacey
Fontaine-lès-Dijon
Hauteville-lès-Dijon
Messigny-et-Vantoux
Norges-la-Ville
Orgeux
Panges
Prenois
Ruffey-lès-Echirey
Saint-Julien
Saint-Martin-du-Mont
Saint-Seine-l'Abbaye
Saussy
Savigny-le-Sec
Trouhaut
Turcey
Val-Suzon
Villotte-Saint-Seine

References

Cantons of Côte-d'Or